Seth W. Godin is an American author and former dot com business executive.

Background

After leaving Spinnaker in 1986, he used $20,000 in savings to found Seth Godin Productions, primarily a book packaging business, out of a studio apartment in New York City. He then met Mark Hurst and founded Yoyodyne (named in jest after the fictional Yoyodyne in The Adventures of Buckaroo Banzai Across the 8th Dimension). After a few years, Godin sold the book packaging business to his employees and focused his efforts on Yoyodyne, where he promoted the concept of permission marketing.

Business ventures
Yoyodyne, launched in 1995, used contests, online games, and scavenger hunts to market companies to participating users. In August 1996, Flatiron Partners invested $4 million in Yoyodyne in return for a 20% stake. At Yoyodyne, Godin published Permission Marketing: Turning strangers into friends and friends into customers. In 1998, he sold Yoyodyne to Yahoo! for about $30 million and became Yahoo's vice president of direct marketing.

In March 2006, Godin launched Squidoo.  In July 2008, Squidoo was one of the 500 most visited sites in the world. By 2014, it was no longer considered financially viable and was sold to HubPages.

Writing
Godin is the author of many books. Free Prize Inside was a Forbes Business Book of the Year in 2004, while Purple Cow sold over 150,000 copies in more than 23 print runs in its first two years. The Dip was a Business Week and New York Times bestseller; Business Week also named Linchpin among its "20 of the best books by the most influential thinkers in business" on November 13, 2015.

In June 2013, Godin raised more than $250,000 from readers with a Kickstarter campaign, which in turn secured him a book contract with his publisher for his book "The Icarus Deception."

Godin was inducted into the American Marketing Association's Marketing Hall of Fame in 2018.

Godin has a chapter on advising in the Tim Ferriss' book Tools of Titans.

Blog
Seth Godin's blog was named by Time among its 25 best blogs of 2009.

Bibliography
 
 
 
 
 
 
 
 
 
 
 
 
 
 
 
  – Detailing the idea of Viral marketing

Personal life
Godin and his wife Helene live in Hastings-on-Hudson, New York, with their two sons.

References

External links

 

Living people
American male bloggers
American bloggers
American business theorists
Advertising theorists
Marketing people
Marketing theorists
American marketing people
People from Hastings-on-Hudson, New York
Writers from Mount Vernon, New York
Stanford Graduate School of Business alumni
Tufts University alumni
Tufts University School of Engineering alumni
Year of birth missing (living people)